The 2010-11 Philippine Basketball Association (PBA) Philippine Cup was the first conference of the 2010-11 PBA season. The tournament started on October 3, 2010, with the new team, Meralco Bolts defeating the Brgy. Ginebra Kings in the opening game. The tournament is an All-Filipino format, which doesn't require an import or a pure-foreign player for each team.

Format
The following format was observed for the duration of the conference:
The teams were divided into 2 groups.

Group A:
Air21 Express
Alaska Aces
Barangay Ginebra Kings
Meralco Bolts
Talk 'N Text Tropang Texters

Group B:
Barako Bull Energy Boosters
B-Meg Derby Ace Llamados
Powerade Tigers
Rain or Shine Elasto Painters
San Miguel Beermen

Teams in a group will play against each other once and against teams in the other group twice; 14 games per team; Teams are then seeded by basis on win–loss records. Ties are broken among point differentials of the tied teams. Standings will be determined in one league table; teams do not qualify by basis of groupings. The top eight teams will advance to the quarterfinals.
Quarterfinal phase:
QF1: #1 vs. #8, with #1 having the twice-to-beat advantage
QF2: #2 vs. #7, with #2 having the twice-to-beat advantage
QF3: #3 vs. #6 in a best-of three series
QF4: #4 vs. #5 in a best-of three series
Best-of-seven Semifinals:
SF1: QF1 vs. QF4
SF2: QF2 vs. QF3
Best-of-seven Finals: winners of the semifinals.

Elimination round

Team standings

Schedule

Bracket

Quarterfinals

(1) Talk 'N Text vs. (8) Rain or Shine

(2) San Miguel vs. (7) Air21

(3) B-Meg Derby Ace vs. (6) Meralco

(4) Barangay Ginebra vs. (5) Alaska

Semifinals

(1) Talk 'N Text vs. (4) B-Meg Derby Ace

(2) San Miguel vs. (3) Barangay Ginebra

Finals

Conference records
Records marked with an asterisk (*) were accomplished with one or more overtime periods.

Team

Individual

Awards

Conference
Best Player of the Conference: Jay Washington (San Miguel)
Finals MVP: Jimmy Alapag and Jayson Castro (Talk 'N Text)

Players of the Week

Statistical leaders

Entire conference

Eliminations

Quarterfinals

Semifinals

Finals

References

External links
 PBA.ph: Official website
 PBA Online: A PBA fansite

PBA Philippine Cup
Philippine Cup